Paolo Montin (born 8 November 1976) is an Italian racecar driver.

Career
Montin finished 2nd in the Italian Formula 3 championship in 1998 driving for Team Ghinzani with 1 win and 113 points. He raced for the team at the Macau GP in the same season, finishing 10th. In 1999 he switched to Italian F3000, driving for Durango, across 7 races securing 1 podium finish. He also raced at the prestigious Macau GP and Korean Super Prix Formula 3 races for Carlin. Montin would finish 2nd in the 2000 Macau GP driving for Target Racing.

In 2001, Montin went to Japan and joined the TOM's racing team. He competed in the Japanese Formula 3 Championship, finishing 2nd with 201 points. The season included 3 wins, 16 podium finishes, 2 pole positions and 6 fastest laps. He also completed his first Super GT race in the TOM's Toyota Supra, finishing 5th at Twin Ring Motegi. For 2002, Montin continued driving for TOM's, finishing 2nd again in the Japanese Formula 3 Championship, this time with 269 points, 7 wins, 8 pole positions and 9 fastest laps. He also qualified on pole position for the 2002 Macau GP.  Alongside his efforts in Formula 3, Montin also raced for the team in Super GT, once again in the Supra. He secured two podiums and finished 18th in the championship.

In 2003, Montin moved on from TOM's and joined Three Bond Racing for his third Japanese Formula 3 Championship. He finished in 4th position, securing 3 wins in the season. In addition, he raced at the Macau GP and Korea Super Prix. He returned to Super GT for one race, driving the Dome Project Honda NSX. After racing once in 2004, in 2005 he returned to Three Bond Racing in Japanese Formula 3. He picked up 1 victory and finished in 5th place overall. Alongside this, he completed two unsuccessful races for Ombra Racing in Formula 3 Euroseries. Montin made a return to Super GT, this time with Jim Gainer in GT300. Driving the Ferrari 360 Modena, he won 1 race, secured 2 podiums and finished 4th in the championship.

Montin did not race competitively again until 2008, when he completed a season in the Porsche Carrera Cup Italy. Driving the single make series Porsche 997 Cup, he finished 6th in the championship for Bonaldi Motorsport, winning one race at Vallelunga, where he also secured a further podium finish.

Racing Record

Career summary

Complete JGTC/Super GT Results

References 

1976 births
Living people
Italian racing drivers
Japanese Formula 3 Championship drivers
Super GT drivers

Formula 3 Euro Series drivers
Ombra Racing drivers
Carlin racing drivers
Durango drivers
Target Racing drivers
TOM'S drivers
RC Motorsport drivers
British Formula Three Championship drivers
Italian Formula Three Championship drivers